Obianuju Ekeocha , also known as Uju (born 1979), is a Nigerian biomedical scientist based in the United Kingdom. She is the founder and president of the activist organisation Culture of Life Africa.

Background
The Nigerian scholar works and lives in the United Kingdom and specialises in Hematology. In 2016, she was employed at a hospital in the UK. She has been a Catholic since her early days when she was raised in Nigeria.

Education
Obianuju had her Secondary school education at the Federal Government Girls' College, Owerri, before proceeding to the University of Nigeria, Nsukka, where she obtained a Bachelors degree in Microbiology. She then moved to the United Kingdom where she obtained a Master's degree in Biomedical science from the University of East London.

Activism
Obianuju gained international recognition for her love for African culture, life and values. In 2012, she wrote a viral open letter (in protest) to Melinda Gates in response to the Gates Foundation's pledge to raise $4.6 billion to fund contraception in developing countries arguing that women in Africa could use improved health care and education as opposed to contraception and abortion forced upon them. Obianuju has been involved in social and political discussions relating the dignity of life within the African culture. In August 2015, she promoted pragmatism at an anti-abortion event of the Ghana Catholic Bishops Conference in the Ghanaian capital Accra. Talking to the Providence College community in the spring of 2018, she criticised a perceived neocolonialism in support of sexual and reproductive health and rights. Being an anti-abortion speaker, she has performed advisory role for legislators and policy makers across Africa, Europe and North America. The activist has appeared as a guest speaker at the White House, the US State Department, the European Parliament amongst other parliaments, e.g. in Africa. Obianuju has also featured on BBC television and Radio, AveMaria Radio and Sacred Heart Radio discussing the African life and culture.

Furthermore, Obianuju is the author of the book Target Africa: Ideological Neocolonialism of the Twenty-First Century.

References

External links
′Obianuju Ekeocha: Founder & President of Culture of Life Africa′ on cultureoflifeafrica.com

1979 births
Living people
Nigerian scientists
Nigerian anti-abortion activists
Nigerian women activists
University of Nigeria alumni